Legland is a townland near Derrygonnelly, in the civil parish of Devenish, religious parish of Botha, barony of Magheraboy, County Fermanagh, Northern Ireland. Legland has an area of 2,965,432 m² / 296.54 hectares / 2.9654 km², or 1.14 square miles, or 732.77 acres / 732 acres, 3 roods, 3 perches.

Etymology
Legland derives from the Irish Leith-ghleann or Leith-ghlionn, meaning "side of the glen", "half valley" or "half glen". The first record of the townland's name is from the Ordnance Survey map of 1609, where it transcribed as Leglan. Other documented versions of the townlands name are Leglan (1615), Laglan (1630), Leaglan (1630), Leagland (1630), Leglan (1630), Lehglenud (1630), Leth-ghleann (1834), Legland hill (1834) and Leith-ghlionn (1869).

See also 
 There are 4 other townlands with the same name in Ireland.
 List of townlands in County Fermanagh

References

Townlands of County Fermanagh